{|
{{Infobox ship image
| Ship image = SNLE-3G-210221105752293576.png
| Ship caption = SNLE 3G-class illustration}}

|}

The SNLE 3G (Sous-Marin Nucléaire Lanceur d'Engins de Troisieme Génération "third generation nuclear ballistic missile submarine") is a class of submarines under development for the French Navy's nuclear deterrent, part of the Force de dissuasion. It is being designed as a replacement for the current Triomphant class beginning around 2035, and could remain in service to as late as 2090.

 Planning 
The current French ballistic missile submarines, the Triomphant class came into service from 1997 and are due to be withdrawn around 2035.  Initial studies for a replacement class began in 2017.  The start of the general detailed design phase for the vessels was announced on 18 February 2021 by Minister of the Armed Forces Florence Parly.

The project is led by the French defence procurement agency, the Direction générale de l'armement, with support from the French Alternative Energies and Atomic Energy Commission. The supply chain will involve 200 companies and 3,000 people. The design phase is expected to require 15 million man hours of effort and the construction of each submarine 20 million man-hours. A memorandum of understanding has been signed with Thales Group to provide a full sonar suite for the new class which will include flank and bow-mounted sonar and a towed array. The suite will require the use of artificial intelligence to manage the increased data outputs.

The cost of the project has been estimated by commentators at around €40 billion, though the Ministry for the Armed Forces has said it is too early to provide an estimate.  The design phase is expected to last around five years.

 Design and operation 
The plan is to construct four submarines, the same number as the Triomphant class.  This is intended to ensure that one vessel can be kept permanently at sea and a second at sea or on short notice to depart.  The remaining two vessels would be in maintenance.  On routine deployments, each vessel is expected to spend around 3 months at sea at a time.  The vessels will, like their predecessors, be based out of Île Longue.

The SNLE 3G submarines are expected to join the fleet from 2035 and remain in service until 2080–2090. The first steel will be cut for the vessels in 2023 and completed submarines delivered at a rate of one every five years from 2035, with the programme completing in 2050.

The vessels are expected to be slightly longer and larger in displacement than the Triomphant class.  They are expected to have improved acoustic and magnetic shielding to reduce their visibility to detection systems.  The vessels are expected to be otherwise similar in design to their predecessors.  They will carry around 100 crew and be armed with 16 M51 nuclear missiles.  The M51, which is currently in use on the Triomphant class, will be upgraded and developed in the future.  The SNLE 3G will feature an X-shaped stern as introduced on the Barracuda-class attack submarine.  The SNLE 3G will be powered by the same K15 nuclear reactor as used on the Barracuda'' class.

See also 
Future of the French Navy

References 

Submarine classes
France defense procurement
Nuclear submarines of the French Navy